Tamaru may refer to:

Tamaru Castle, a hilltop castle in Tamaki, Mie Prefecture, Japan
Tamaru Station, a railway station in Tamaki, Mie Prefecture, Japan

People with the surname
, Japanese voice actor

Japanese-language surnames